Opsilia irakensis is a species of beetle from the family Cerambycidae native to Iraq.

References

Beetles described in 1967
Endemic fauna of Iraq
irakensis